Mordellistena metcalfi is a species of beetle in the genus Mordellistena of the family Mordellidae. It was discovered in 1936.

References

metcalfi
Beetles described in 1854